Erin is a town in Wellington County, approximately  northwest of Toronto, Ontario, Canada. Erin is bordered by the Town of Caledon, Ontario to the east, the Town of Halton Hills to the south, the Township of Guelph/Eramosa to the west and the Township of East Garafraxa to the north.

The amalgamated town is composed of the former Villages of Erin and Hillsburgh, both urban centres now, as well as the former Township of Erin (which contained the hamlets of Ballinafad, Brisbane, Cedar Valley, Crewson's Corners, Ospringe and Orton). Erin's Town Council includes a Mayor and four councillors. Its upper tier government is provided by Wellington County.

Erin is primarily a rural community but, while farming is still an important activity in the town, most of its population works in the nearby cities of Brampton, Mississauga, Guelph, and even Toronto.  The town's new industrial park is attracting a number of new industries, due to its cheaper tax rate, accessibility to transportation, and its location within the "Technology Triangle," a series of high-tech driven cities including nearby Kitchener, Waterloo  and Cambridge.

The community not for profit organization is East Wellington Community Services.

Communities
In addition to the primary settlement of Erin, the town also includes the smaller communities of Ballinafad, Brisbane, Cedar Valley, Crewson's Corners, Orton and Ospringe as well as Hillsburgh, an urban centre. The population in 2016 was 12,400. The town also includes rural cluster areas such as Binkham, Churchill (partially), Coningsby and Mimosa.

History
The first settlers of European descent in the area then known as Erin Township were George and Nathaniel Roszel from Pennsylvania who arrived in November 1820; Nathanial acquired land in what is now Ballinafad. (Most of the settlers during the township's development were Scottish.) In 1821, William How and his family arrived from England and built a home in what is now Hillsburgh; he started the first general store in that community. The first Township Meeting was held on January 5, 1824; Henry Trout Sr. was appointed Town Clerk. The township halls have always been in or near Hillsburgh. The township population grew over the years from 1,368 in 1841, to 3,055 in 1850 when 15,400 acres were under cultivation.

The urban community now called Erin developed after mills were built on the Credit River between 1826 and 1829. The first settlers included Daniel MacMillan and the Trout family. The settlement was established as "MacMillan's Mills" although most sources indicate that the Trout family built the first sawmill. Even so, Daniel MacMillan and his brothers are acknowledged as significant contributors to the growth of the village.

By 1839 a post-office had opened. Records from 1841 indicate that the entire Township of Erin had a population of just 1,368. By 1846, the small settlement in the south-west of the township, then called McMillen's Mills, had a grist and saw mill, a tavern and blacksmith's shop but only 40 to 50 residents.

In 1849, the first place of worship, the Union Church was being used by several denominations. Previously, services had been held in homes and in other available buildings. By 1851, the population increased to 300; the name of the settlement was Erinsville at the time but was later shortened to Erin. Businesses in the area included a distillery, a tannery, and carding, oatmeal and grist-mills. The river provided the power for mills, helping to boost agriculture, milling and wood products manufacturing. By 1869 the population was 600 and the post office was receiving mail daily.

The Credit Valley Railway reached Erin in 1879 and the same year, Erin was incorporated as a village. At the time the population was 750.

Electricity from small private providers became available before 1890 and a formal power company was established in 1900, Cataract Light & Power. Hydro power was generated at Cataract, in Caledon, an area that is now in the Forks of the Credit Provincial Park.  That facility was sold to Ontario Hydro in 1944 and continued to operate until 1947.

Demographics 

Mother tongue (2006):
 English as first language: 91.4%
 French as first language: 1.1%
 English and French as first language: 0.4%
 Other as first language: 7.1%

Culture
Erin revolves around its community centre, called Centre 2000. The building was added to the existing community centre. The facility now includes Erin District High School, 300-seat theatre, large double gym, arena, 6 vending machines, many community rooms, dentist, physiotherapist, Erin Branch of the Wellington Library, daycare, and many other features. Erin Village Alliance Church meets at 155 Main St.  Within the walls of Centre 2000 is Erin Cinema, located in the 300-seat theatre. It showed first run movies and Toronto Film Festival Circuit films on weekends and some weekdays before it was shut down in 2015.

Government
The County of Wellington is Erin's upper tier government; as of early 2019, Pierre Brianceau was County Councillor, Wellington County. The Mayor of Erin is Allan (Al) Alls. The town is located within the provincial riding of Waterloo-Wellington, and the Member of Provincial Parliament at the time was Ted Arnott. The federal riding is Wellington Halton Hills, and the Member of Parliament was Mike Chong.

Health care
There are no hospitals located within Erin; services for residents are provided by Groves Memorial Community Hospital in Fergus, Ontario and by Guelph General Hospital. The East Wellington Family Health Team operates a clinic in the urban area of Erin and also in nearby Rockwood, Ontario. Some Erin residents are not far from the Headwaters Health Care Centre in Orangeville, Ontario.

Education
Public schools in the County are operated by the Upper Grand District School Board while Catholic schools are operated by the Wellington Catholic District School Board. Schools within Erin include Ross R. MacKay Public School, Brisbane Public School, Erin Public School and Erin District High School. The only Catholic school is St. John Brebeuf Catholic School.

Media
The town of Erin has their community radio station CHES-FM broadcasting at 91.7 FM. Their local newspaper The Erin Advocate has a weekly paid-circulation of 2,500 and is published by Metroland Media Group Ltd. The Erin Advocate also publishes the monthly Country Routes paper distributed to surrounding areas.  Newspapers that cover Erin news and events and are distributed door to door for free include the Wellington Advertiser and the Orangeville Banner. Erin District High School has its own closed circuit TV station, primarily used for announcements, EDHS TV. Two other newspapers also cover Erin to some extent, The Independent (Georgetown) and The Halton Herald.

Notable residents
Erin is home to many notable residents, including Ex-NHL player Jeff Shevalier, the late musician Stompin' Tom Connors, NHL Referee Terry Gregson, and Franco-Ontarian poet Robert Dickson.

Arms

See also

 Element Yachts
 List of towns in Ontario
 List of townships in Ontario
 List of population centres in Ontario

References

External links

Lower-tier municipalities in Ontario
Municipalities in Wellington County, Ontario
Towns in Ontario